Vespanthedon is a genus of moths in the family Sesiidae. It contains the species Vespanthedon cerceris, which is known from Mozambique, and Vespanthedon chalciphora.

References

Sesiidae
Lepidoptera of Mozambique
Moths of Sub-Saharan Africa